Conus glenni, common name the Effulgent cone, is a species of sea snail, a marine gastropod mollusk in the family Conidae, the cone snails and their allies.

Like all species within the genus Conus, these snails are predatory and venomous. They are capable of "stinging" humans, therefore live ones should be handled carefully or not at all.

Distribution
This species occurs in the Caribbean Sea off Panama and Colombia.

Description 
The maximum recorded shell length is 18.5 mm.

Habitat 
Minimum recorded depth is 1 m. Maximum recorded depth is 1 m.

References

 Petuch, E. J. 1993b. Molluscan Discoveries from the tropical western Atlantic region. Part II. A new species of Leporiconus Iredale, 1930 from the San Blas Islands, Panama. La Conchiglia 25(266):57–59, 5 figs.
  Puillandre N., Duda T.F., Meyer C., Olivera B.M. & Bouchet P. (2015). One, four or 100 genera? A new classification of the cone snails. Journal of Molluscan Studies. 81: 1–23

External links
 The Conus Biodiversity website
 Cone Shells – Knights of the Sea
 

glenni
Gastropods described in 1993